Barry Township is a township in Pine County, Minnesota, United States. The population was 587 at the 2000 census.

The township was named for Edward Barry, a railroad engineer.

Geography

Demographics
As of the census of 2000, there were 587 people, 209 households, and 155 families residing in the township.  The population density was 16.7 people per square mile (6.4/km2).  There were 258 housing units at an average density of 7.3/sq mi (2.8/km2).  The racial makeup of the township was 83.82% White, 0.34% African American, 13.12% Native American, 0.68% Asian, 0.17% from other races, and 1.87% from two or more races. Hispanic or Latino of any race were 1.19% of the population.

There were 209 households, out of which 40.2% had children under the age of 18 living with them, 58.9% were married couples living together, 9.6% had a female householder with no husband present, and 25.4% were non-families. 20.6% of all households were made up of individuals, and 7.7% had someone living alone who was 65 years of age or older.  The average household size was 2.81 and the average family size was 3.19.

In the township the population was spread out, with 31.5% under the age of 18, 7.5% from 18 to 24, 29.1% from 25 to 44, 21.6% from 45 to 64, and 10.2% who were 65 years of age or older.  The median age was 35 years. For every 100 females, there were 107.4 males.  For every 100 females age 18 and over, there were 106.2 males.

The median income for a household in the township was $35,227, and the median income for a family was $37,250. Males had a median income of $30,288 versus $21,944 for females. The per capita income for the township was $14,740.  About 12.0% of families and 17.7% of the population were below the poverty line, including 22.8% of those under age 18 and 22.7% of those age 65 or over.

References

Townships in Pine County, Minnesota
Townships in Minnesota